Band II is the range of radio frequencies within the very high frequency (VHF) part of the electromagnetic spectrum from 87.5 to 108.0 megahertz (MHz).

Radio 
Band II is primarily used worldwide for FM radio broadcasting.

Broadcast television

Usage in Russia and in other former members of OIRT 

In the former Soviet Union and other countries-members of OIRT, frequencies from 76 MHz to 100 MHz were designated for broadcast television usage. Considering 8 MHz channel bandwidth used by the Russian analog television system (System D), the following television channels had been defined:

Broadcast television channels 1 and 2 are assigned to VHF I band, channels 6 to 12 are assigned to VHF III band.

Starting from the early 1990s, frequencies previously allotted to television channels 4 and 5 have been re-allocated for FM radio, thereby harmonizing it with the Western allocation for FM radio service.

References

Radio spectrum
Broadcast engineering